The yellow-footed green pigeon (Treron phoenicopterus), also known as yellow-legged green pigeon, is a common species of green pigeon found in the Indian subcontinent and parts of Southeast Asia. It is the state bird of Maharashtra. In Marathi, it is called Haroli or Hariyal. It is known as Haitha in Upper Assam and Haitol in Lower Assam. The species feeds on fruit, including many species of Ficus. They forage in flocks. In the early morning, they are often seen sunning on the tops of emergent trees in dense forest areas.

References

 Rasmussen, P. C. and Anderton, J. C. (2005) Birds of South Asia. The Ripley Guide. Vol 1 and 2. Smithsonian Institution and Lynx Editions.

yellow-footed green pigeon
Birds of South Asia
Birds of Cambodia
Birds of Laos
Birds of Myanmar
Birds of Southeast Asia
yellow-footed green pigeon
Birds of Nepal
Symbols of Maharashtra